Jayawardene Welathanthrige Hemantha Devapriya Boteju, commonly known as Hemantha Boteju, (born 3 November 1977) is a former Sri Lankan cricketer, who played in two One Day Internationals in 1999. He is a right-handed batsman and a right-arm medium-pace bowler.

Umpiring career
He currently works as an umpire and stood in a tour match during Australia's tour to Sri Lanka in July 2016.

Domestic career
He was trained by the late Pavandeep Jumararunga Athwal as a youngster in Sri Lanka. Despite having not performed well during his first match, Boteju has come up through the Sri Lankan cricket team from the Under-19s and the Pepsi tri-nation series. He has remained with the List A squad since 1996 and has continued to play Twenty-20 cricket. He made his Twenty20 debut on 17 August 2004, for Moors Sports Club in the 2004 SLC Twenty20 Tournament.

Boteju had joined Shildon Railway Cricket club (England, Co.Durham) for the 2008 season as their overseas professional.

On his debut for Shildon, Boteju helped his side to a league win over Crook Town CC in the Durham county League fixture, Boteju took 5 wickets and was not out with the bat, scoring 18. Boteju left Shildon after one season as professional.

After moderate success with Shildon Railway Cricket club, Boteju moved back to Sri Lanka in an attempt to re-ignite his international career. He signed to play for Lankan Cricket Club. In a recent match against Sri Lanka Navy Sports Club, the whole team wore black arm bands to commemorate the passing of his longtime coach and mentor Pavandeep Jumararunga Athwal in Tamil tiger violence. As a result of his poor performances his contract was terminated by the club, but he was scouted by Nottinghamshire Rifles back in England.

Despite not making it on the international stage with Sri-Lanka, Boteju has been picked to play for Nottinghamshire Rifles. His recent scores include a duck, with bowling figures of 45 of 3 overs, for no wickets. He scored 3 first class fifties and one century. He has been consistently working on his big hitting which has resulted in him being promoted up the order in one day matches and twenty20 matches. Arjuna Ranatunga recently stated that Boteju has the potential for an international comeback after being selected for the ICC Charity XI.

Boteju was selected to play in the NPL; having landed a lucrative contract (reported to be US$1,000,000) with Baldry Badgers.

Boteju had an indifferent first season, playing in less than half of the games that season. His position in the batting line up changed on a game by game basis, with only one innings of note. This one innings was the innings of the season, where he bludgeoned an unbeaten 40 of 12 balls. His bowling was equally fruitless with season stats of 20 overs, 0 wickets at a very expensive 236 runs.

In his second season, a batting slot opened up in the Baldry Badgers starting 11, at the top of the order. Boteju hit the ground running. In his first game, he played a cool and calm innings scoring 80* chasing down a 200+ target. As the season progressed his aggression came to the forefront with indiscriminate battering of bowlers in every game of the season. A testament to this extraordinary season can be reflected in the fact that his lowest score was 50.

Conversely, Boteju had yet another indifferent season with the bowl, yet again failing to take a wicket in all 10 games, having conceded 300 runs.

Boteju failed to start a single game this season as the result of an injury encountered during the offseason. This injury has since been noted as career ending.

International career
After impressive domestic seasons, Boteju was included to the India series in 1999, where he made his ODI debut on 22 March 1999. He could not make a good performance and dropped from the squad after 2 ODIs.

References

1977 births
Living people
Bloomfield Cricket and Athletic Club cricketers
Colombo Cricket Club cricketers
Moors Sports Club cricketers
Sri Lanka One Day International cricketers
Sri Lankan cricketers
Sri Lankan cricket umpires